Balša Radović (born 4 January 1991) is a Montenegrin professional footballer who currently plays for FK Mornar in the Montenegrin First League.

Club career
In February 2019, Radović joined FK Arsenal Tivat in the Montenegrin Second League.

References

1991 births
Living people
Footballers from Podgorica
Association football midfielders
Montenegrin footballers
Montenegro youth international footballers
Montenegro under-21 international footballers
NK IB 1975 Ljubljana players
FK Lovćen players
Episkopi F.C. players
Flamurtari Vlorë players
FK Kom players
Luftëtari Gjirokastër players
FK Igalo 1929 players
Slovenian PrvaLiga players
Montenegrin First League players
Football League (Greece) players
Kategoria Superiore players
Montenegrin Second League players
Montenegrin expatriate footballers
Expatriate footballers in Slovenia
Montenegrin expatriate sportspeople in Slovenia
Expatriate footballers in Greece
Montenegrin expatriate sportspeople in Greece
Expatriate footballers in Albania
Montenegrin expatriate sportspeople in Albania